Futrono Fault is a NWW tending geological fault in Los Ríos Region, running from the northern shore of Ranco Lake through the areas immediately south of Maihue Lake, where it intersects the large Liquiñe-Ofqui Fault, and through the east along the Hueinahue River. The volcanic group of Carrán-Los Venados is located above the fault.

Seismic faults of Chile
Strike-slip faults
Geology of Los Ríos Region